The Lassen County Court House, on Courthouse Square in Susanville, California, is a courthouse built in 1917.  It was listed on the National Register of Historic Places in 1998.

It was designed by architect George C. Sellon and is Classical Revival in style.

References

Courthouses in California
National Register of Historic Places in Lassen County, California
Neoclassical architecture in California
Government buildings completed in 1917